The Pilgrimage for Engineering students.

Patwatoli is a locality in the Manpurblock of the Gaya district, Bihar, India, traditionally known for its weavers but now known for having a disproportionately high number of youths studying at Indian Institutes of Technology, National Institutes of Technology, with at least 200 of the 1,000 households in the locality having at least one engineer.

Some students have started opting for the diverse academic course. First success had come in 2018 in BPSC.

Students qualified for Indian Institutes of Technology in 2018 was 5.

References

 Gaya district